Shades is an album by American jazz pianist Andrew Hill, recorded in 1986 and released on the Italian Soul Note label in 1988. The album features six of Hill's original compositions, four performed by a quartet and two by a trio.

Reception 

The Allmusic review by Scott Yanow awarded the album 4 stars calling it "Stimulating and unusual music that is difficult to classify as anything but "modern jazz"".

Track listing 
All compositions by Andrew Hill
 "Monk's Glimpse" - 4:36  
 "Tripping" (aka "Naked Spirit") - 6:31  
 "Chilly Mac" - 5:29  
 "Ball Square" - 5:34  
 "Domani" - 7:28  
 "La Verne" - 13:43  
Recorded at Barigozzi Studio, Milano, Italy on July 3 & 4, 1986

Personnel 
 Andrew Hill - piano
 Clifford Jordan - tenor saxophone (tracks 1, 3, 5 & 6)
 Rufus Reid - bass
 Ben Riley - drums

References 

Black Saint/Soul Note albums
Andrew Hill albums
1988 albums